Marc Trudel (March 29, 1896 – September 10, 1961) was a politician in Quebec, Canada.

He served as Cabinet Member and Member of the Legislative Assembly of Quebec.

Early life

He was born on March 29, 1896 in Sainte-Geneviève-de-Batiscan and moved to Shawinigan in 1923.  Trudel was a physician.  He married Alice Lambert on May 10, 1926.

Member of the legislature

He ran as an Action libérale nationale candidate in 1935 and defeated incumbent Liberal MLA Joseph-Auguste Frigon.  Trudel joined Maurice Duplessis and the Union Nationale when the party was established; he was re-elected in 1936.

Duplessis served one term as Premier.  Before another election was called, World War II broke out.  The conscription issue really hurt the Union Nationale's chances of re-election.  Trudel and most of his colleagues were voted out in 1939.

Member of the Cabinet

In 1944 though, the Union Nationale was sent back in office and Trudel defeated incumbent Polydore Beaulac.  Duplessis appointed Trudel to the Cabinet as a Minister without Portfolio.  The assignment consists more of an honour than an actual responsibility.  Nonetheless it gave Trudel more prominence.

Trudel was re-elected in 1948.  In 1952 however, he lost re-election against René Hamel.

After Retirement from Politics

Trudel died in Shawinigan on September 10, 1961.

Legacy

Place Trudel and Pont Trudel (Trudel Bridge) in Shawinigan-Sud were named to honour Doctor Marc Trudel.

See also
Mauricie
Saint-Maurice Legislators
Saint-Maurice Provincial Electoral District
Shawinigan, Quebec

Footnotes

External links

1896 births
1961 deaths
Action libérale nationale MNAs
Union Nationale (Quebec) MNAs
People from Shawinigan
Vice Presidents of the National Assembly of Quebec